Mark Edward Wohlers (born January 23, 1970) is a former professional baseball pitcher. A right-hander, he played all or parts of 12 seasons in Major League Baseball, exclusively as a relief pitcher. He is best known for his years with the Atlanta Braves from 1991 to 1999. He is the third fastest recorded pitcher in baseball history, having thrown a pitch recorded at 103 miles per hour during a spring training session in 1995; the record was broken by Detroit Tigers pitcher Joel Zumaya with a  pitch.

Early life
Wohlers grew up "dirt poor" in Holyoke, Massachusetts. His parents divorced when he was nine years old and he was raised primarily by his mother, Irene. He began working at fourteen years old, washing dishes in a restaurant until midnight. Wohlers committed to play college baseball for the Maine Black Bears before graduating from Holyoke High School in 1988.

Career
Wohlers was selected in the eighth round of the 1988 amateur draft by the Braves. He went on to make his major league debut with the Braves on August 17, 1991. On September 11, Wohlers teamed with fellow Braves hurlers Kent Mercker and Alejandro Peña for a combined no-hitter against the San Diego Padres; Wohlers pitched two innings in relief of Mercker. The 13th no-hitter in Braves franchise history, attendance was 20,477 at Fulton-County Stadium in the 1–0 shutout win. 

After spending the following three seasons as a setup pitcher, Wohlers was given the job as a closer in 1995. He went on to record 97 saves over the next three seasons, also saving the 1–0 victory in the clinching Game 6 of the 1995 World Series, establishing himself as one of the best closers in the majors.

Wohlers' success would not last forever. In Game 4 of the 1996 World Series against the New York Yankees, Wohlers gave up a stunning 3-run home run to Jim Leyritz that tied the game at 6. After this, the momentum of the Series shifted and the Yankees won it in six games. Many observe that Wohlers was never the same after that. In 1998, he seemed to lose all ability to control his pitches. He spent part of the season at Triple-A Richmond, but still finished the season with a major league earned run average of 10.18. His control problems were dramatic. In  major league innings, Wohlers  walked 33 batters. After being sent down to Triple-A, Wohlers walked 36 batters in only  innings. His symptoms were a prime example of what is commonly known as  Steve Blass disease – a psychological block which manifests itself when baseball players overthink the act of throwing a baseball and consequently become unable to throw with any sort of control. The Associated Press called him "the 1990s poster child for Steve Blass Syndrome."

The Atlanta faithful, although frustrated with Wohlers' seemingly constant fastballs to the backstop or behind batters, rallied behind the embattled pitcher and would fervently cheer him on whenever he was in the game. After being recalled from Richmond, he entered a game and recorded a strikeout, his first in months, and received a rousing standing ovation from the crowd at Turner Field.

On April 16, 1999, the Braves traded Wohlers to the Cincinnati Reds in return for John Hudek. The day after signing for the Reds he was put on the disabled list with an anxiety disorder. While undergoing treatment for his anxiety, Wohlers had Tommy John surgery on his elbow, which ended his season. Wohlers returned to baseball for the 2000 season in his old role as a setup man. He split the following season between the Reds and the Yankees before being traded to the Cleveland Indians prior to the 2002 season.

In his first season with the Indians, Wohlers recorded an ERA of 4.79, with seven saves, three wins, four losses, and a much improved walk ratio. After experiencing pain in his right elbow in spring training before the 2003 season, Wohlers had an operation to remove several bone chips, ruling him out for the first two months of the season. Unfortunately, his season ended in the second game of his rehabilitation assignment at Double-A Akron when he ruptured the tendon graft he had had in his elbow in 1999. He had Tommy John surgery for the second time in August of that year, which should have allowed him to return for the 2004 season. However, Wohlers decided not to return due to personal reasons and was released by the Indians. He did not return to baseball, although he never formally announced his retirement. His career record is 39–29 with an ERA of 3.97 and 119 saves.

Personal life
Wohlers' first wife, Nancy, filed for divorce in Fulton County Superior Court in July 1998. Their daughter, Austyn, was born in 1996.

In the early morning of March 1, 2011, Wohlers' home in Milton, Georgia, caught fire, burnt down in under an hour, and was considered a "total loss" by the local fire department. However, some of Wohlers' sports memorabilia was recovered from his basement. He has credited his wife, Kimberly, with getting him, his two sons, and youngest daughter out of the house in time. His eldest daughter was not present at the time of the fire.
 
Wohlers and his wife currently run an Atlanta real estate business called Team Wohlers, at Solid Source Realty.

In popular culture
Wohlers was one of three Atlanta Braves to appear on Saturday Night Live when he made a cameo appearance alongside teammates Gerald Williams and Pedro Borbón, Jr. on the December 13, 1997, episode hosted by Helen Hunt.

See also

 List of Major League Baseball single-inning strikeout leaders

References

External links

Major League Baseball pitchers
Atlanta Braves players
Cincinnati Reds players
New York Yankees players
Cleveland Indians players
National League All-Stars
Pulaski Braves players
Sumter Braves players
Greenville Braves players
Richmond Braves players
Rockford Reds players
Chattanooga Lookouts players
Indianapolis Indians players
Dayton Dragons players
Louisville RiverBats players
Akron Aeros players
Baseball players from Massachusetts
Sportspeople from Holyoke, Massachusetts
1970 births
Living people